Poland competed at the 1998 European Athletics Championships in Budapest, Hungary, from 18 to 23 August 1998. A delegation of 59 athletes were sent to represent the country.

Medals

References

European Athletics Championships
Nations at the 1998 European Athletics Championships
1998